Brian or Bryan Rose may refer to:

Brian Rose (cricketer) (born 1950), English former cricketer
Brian Rose (baseball) (born 1976), American former baseball player
Brian Rose (podcaster) (born 1971), American-born podcaster based in London
Brian Rose (racing driver) (born 1979), American former stock car racing driver
Brian Rose (boxer) (born 1985), British boxer
C. Brian Rose, American archaeologist
Bryan Rose (born 1943), New Zealand former long-distance runner